Albino Baldan (4 February 1925 – 25 February 1991) was an Italian rower. He competed in the men's eight event at the 1952 Summer Olympics.

References

External links
 

1925 births
1991 deaths
Italian male rowers
Olympic rowers of Italy
Rowers at the 1952 Summer Olympics
Sportspeople from Venice